Newportia is a genus of scolopocryptopid centipedes. It has around 50 described species to date.

Species
 Newportia adisi Schileyko & Minelli, 1999
 Newportia albana Chamberlin, 1957
 Newportia amazonica Brölemann, 1905
 Newportia andina González-Sponga, 1998
 Newportia atoyaca Chamberlin, 1943
 Newportia aureana Bücherl, 1942
 Newportia autanensis González-Sponga, 2001
 Newportia avilensis González-Sponga, 1998
 Newportia azteca Humbert & Saussure, 1869
 Newportia bauxita González-Sponga, 1998
 Newportia bielawaskii Matic, Negrea & Fundora-Martinez, 1977
 Newportia brevipes Pocock, 1891
 Newportia brevisegmentata González-Sponga, 2001
 Newportia cerrocopeyensis González-Sponga, 2001
 Newportia cubana Chamberlin, 1915
 Newportia dentata Pocock, 1890
 Newportia diagramma Chamberlin, 1921
 Newportia divergens Chamberlin, 1922
 Newportia ernsti Pocock, 1891
 Newportia fuhrmanni Raibaut, 1912
 Newportia guaiquinimensis González-Sponga, 2001
 Newportia heteropoda Chamberlin, 1918
 Newportia igneorata Kraus, 1955
 Newportia inflata González-Sponga, 2001
 Newportia isleanae González-Sponga, 2001
 Newportia lasia Chamberlin, 1921
 Newportia lata González-Sponga, 2001
 Newportia leptotarsis Negrea, Matic & Fundora-Martinez, 1973
 Newportia longitarsis (Newport, 1845)
 Newportia maxima Bücherl, 1942
 Newportia mexicana (Saussure, 1858)
 Newportia monticola Pocock, 1890
 Newportia morela Chamberlin, 1943
 Newportia mosquei González-Sponga, 2001
 Newportia oligopla Chamberlin, 1945
 Newportia oreina Chamberlin, 1915
 Newportia paraensis Chamberlin, 1914
 Newportia patavina Schileyko & Minelli, 1999
 Newportia pelaezi Chamberlin, 1942
 Newportia phoretha Chamberlin, 1950
 Newportia pijiguaoensis González-Sponga, 2001
 Newportia pilosa González-Sponga, 1998
 Newportia prima González-Sponga, 1998
 Newportia pusilla Pocock, 1893
 Newportia sabina Chamberlin, 1942
 Newportia sargenti Chamberlin, 1958
 Newportia simoni Brölemann, 1898
 Newportia spinipes Pocock, 1896
 Newportia stoevi Schileyko, 2013
 Newportia stolli (Pocock, 1896)
 Newportia tachirensis González-Sponga, 1998
 Newportia tepuiana González-Sponga, 2001
 Newportia tetraspinae González-Sponga, 2001
 Newportia troglobia Chagas & Shelley, 2003
 Newportia unguifer Chamberlin, 1921
 Newportia weyrauchi Chamberlin, 1955

References

External links
 Encyclopedia of Life entry

Centipede genera
Scolopendromorpha